William Moulton may refer to:
 William Fiddian Moulton, English Methodist minister, biblical scholar and educator
 William C. Moulton, member of the Massachusetts Senate
 William Moulton (bowls) (born 2000), English bowls player

See also
 William Moulton Marston, American psychologist and comic book writer who created the character Wonder Woman